Ogeechee may refer to:

 Ogeechee River, a river in Georgia, US
 Ogeechee lime tree, a deciduous tree with edible fruit
 USS Ogeechee (AOG-35), a World War II U.S. Navy gasoline tanker
 Ogeechee Technical College, a college in Statesboro, Georgia, US

See also

 Geechee (disambiguation)
 Little Ogeechee River (disambiguation)
 Savannah–Ogeechee Canal, between the Savannah and Ogeechee rivers